Takahiro Momiyama (籾山高広), known as jamzvillage, is a Japanese singer and solo unit. He was born on September 28, 1978 in Aichi Prefecture, Japan. He is a part of Sony Music Japan's SME Records division.

Biography 
jamzvillage debuted in 2002 with his single "Let's Dance!", which was featured on numerous Japanese TV programs including Pop Japan.tv.

After releasing two more singles, Momiyama released new singles on his Sony website (now offline). Titles included ☆ (Hoshi) and Hey Girl.

Releases 
 Let's Dance (05/28/2003)
 Love ALone (10/22/2003)
 北風　(Kitakaze) (01/28/2004)

Trivia 
 Fans call jamzvillage "momi", the first part of his last name (Momiyama).
 Jamzvillage is rumored to have given up his solo career and is now performing with SWEET SEGMENT.

External links 
 Sony Music Online Store
 Where is JAMZVILLAGE?

1978 births
Japanese male musicians
Living people
Musicians from Aichi Prefecture
Sony Music Entertainment Japan artists
21st-century Japanese singers
21st-century Japanese male singers